Michael Alan Krawitz is a US Air force veteran, Executive Director of the non-profit Veterans for Medical Cannabis Access, researcher on the history of medical cannabis, and international advocate for cannabis policy reform with FAAAT think & do tank and the International Association for Cannabinoid Medicines.

Biography
Krawitz served in the United States Air Force from 1981 to 1986 as an Electronic Warfare Systems Technician and was a sergeant. He was stationed in Guam.

Apart from his military career, Krawitz has been involved in the United States, researching the traditions and historicity of cannabis in the country, as well as working to secure access and availability of medical cannabis for veterans, in particular with the United States Department of Veterans Affairs and has extended its involvement at the international level since the United Nations General Assembly Special Session on the world drug situation in 1998 throughout the 2020s.

Internationally he has been involved in the New-York NGO Committee on Drugs as Executive Committee member, as patient representative of the International Association for Cannabinoid Medicines. Krawitz is also policy adviser of the organization FAAAT think & do tank for his involvement around the World Health Organization and Single Convention on Narcotic Drugs international scheduling of Cannabis, being instrumental in the efforts leading to the withdrawal of "cannabis and cannabis resin" from Schedule IV of the 1961 Convention, in December 2020.

Krawitz is also working on the creation of Appellation of Origin and other intellectual property tools for traditional Cannabis products, both in the United States, participating as a board member of the Californian farmers organization Origins Council, and internationally as a registered observer to the World Intellectual Property Organization.

Since 2021, he has been member of board of advisors to the Virginia Cannabis Control Authority (Cannabis Public Health Advisory Council).

Publications

References

External links
Veterans for Medical Cannabis Access website.
FAAAT think & do tank website.
Michael Krawitz on ResearchGate

Year of birth missing (living people)
Living people
American cannabis activists
United States Air Force airmen